Mathew P. John was a Biblical Scholar and President of the Society for Biblical Studies in India.

Studies 
M. P. John studied Bachelor of Divinity from 1943–1949 at Serampore College, Serampore during the Principalship of G. H. C. Angus.

Career 
From 1947 to 1971 he was Lecturer of New Testament at Serampore College, Serampore,.  where he once studied. He later undertook doctoral studies in Chicago in New Testament between 1960 and 1963 and returned to Serampore to take up his teaching assignments.  However, it was not until 1969 that he could complete his doctoral studies.  M. P. John became the Rector of Serampore College in 1964, a position in which he continued until he left the College in January 1971 and joined the Translations Department of the Bible Society of India and oversaw the common language translations in Shillong, Meghalaya.

After M. P. John's stint with the Bible Society of India, he joined the Bishop's College, Kolkata and became its Principal.

References 
Notes

Further reading
 

Indian biblical scholars
Indian Christian theologians
Bible translators
Senate of Serampore College (University) alumni
Living people
Academic staff of the Senate of Serampore College (University)
Year of birth missing (living people)